Porphyridium cruentum is a species of red algae in the family Porphyridiophyceae.

The microalga Porphyridium sp. is a potential source for several products like fatty acids, lipids, cell-wall polysaccharides  and pigments . The polysaccharides of this species are sulphated and their structure gives rise to some unique properties that could lead to a broad range of industrial and pharmaceutical applications. Additionally, P. cruentum biomass contains carbohydrates of up to 57% have been reported. Thus, the combined amount of carbohydrates in biomass and exopolysaccharides of this microalga could potentially provide the source for bio-fuel and pharmaceutical.  This algae contains phycoerythrin that can be extracted by lyse and chromatography.

The genus Porphyridium has been classified among blue-green, red, and green algae.

References

External links
 

Porphyridiophyceae
Algaculture
Algae biofuels